GMV, founded in 1984, is a Spanish private capital business group with an international presence and more than 3000 employees (2022). In its early days, it focused on providing solutions for the space and defense sectors, being the contract for the European Space Operations Centre (ESOC) the beginning of its growth. Over the years it has diversified its operations and expanded into other fields becoming today’s technology group, which comprises 11 areas of specialization: Space, Aeronautics, Defense and Security, Intelligent Transportation Systems (ITS), Automotive, Cybersecurity, Healthcare, and Digital Public Services, Industry, Financial sector, and Services.

Nowadays it provides high-tech products, services and solutions that keep sustainable development in mind and are designed to serve society. The company’s growth strategy is based on continuous innovation

GMV has offices in 12 countries and clients on five continents. It has CMMI level 5, the highest level of this maturity model for improving the capacity of software development processes.

History 

Founded in 1984 by Juan José Martínez García, GMV began operations in the field of space when it won its first contract with the European Space Agency Operation Center (ESOC) from the European Space Agency.

In the early nineties GMV expanded its activity and began to offer solutions and services in the areas of transport, defense, telecommunications, and information technologies, standing out in fields that were just starting up at that time, such as the internet and satellite navigation applications. In the year 2000, it joined the European consortium Galileo Industries S.A. to support the development and use of the Galileo European satellite navigation system. In 2001, the company changed direction, with Dr. Mónica Martínez Walter becoming the CEO.

In 2004, the first subsidiary outside of Spain was established in the United States to cover aerospace operations in the American market. It continued expanding in 2007 with the acquisition of the Portuguese company Skysoft. The most significant expansion was from 2009 to 2014 when a regional office in Malaysia and subsidiaries in Germany, Poland, Romania, France, Colombia, and the UK opened. From 2015 to 2018, it continued expanding its international presence with the acquisition of INSYEN AG in Germany and the company Syncromatics Corp in the US, both of which are currently operating under the GMV brand, in addition to also investing in the Spanish startup PLD Space.

At the end of 2018 it won the contract award to maintain and upgrade Galileo's Ground Control Segment, making it the largest contract signed by the Spanish space industry to date. In 2020 GMV acquired the British company Nottingham Scientific Limited (NSL), merging it with its own British subsidiary (GMV Innovating Solutions Limited) creating the company GMV NSL, which in 2022 began to operate under the GMV brand, along with the other subsidiaries.

As a declaration of its commitment to sustainable development based on innovation for progress, in 2022 GMV joined the UN Global Compact, the leading international initiative promoting corporate sustainability and responsibility. In this way, GMV takes up and assumes the legacy of one of its subsidiaries, which joined the Global Compact in 2014.

Areas of activity 

GMV operates mainly in the following sectors:
 Aeronautics
 Automotive
 Banking and Insurance
 Cybersecurity
 Defense and security
 Health care
 ICT for Business
 Intelligent Transportation Systems
 Public Administration
 Space
 Telecommunications

GMV around the world 

GMV is present in the following cities and countries:
 Spain
 Madrid: Tres Cantos (head offices)
 Valladolid: Boecillo
 Seville
 Barcelona: L'Ametlla del Vallès and L'Hospitalet de Llobregat
 Valencia
 Zaragoza
 Portugal
 Lisbon
 United States
 Rockville, Maryland
 Los Angeles, California
 Houston, Texas
 Poland
 Warsaw
 Germany
 Darmstadt
 Weßling
 Gilching
 United Kingdom
 Didcot
 Nottingham
 France
 Toulouse
 Romania
 Bucharest
 Belgium
 Brussels
 Malaysia
 Kuala Lumpur
 Colombia
 Bogotá
 Netherlands
 Amsterdam

World Bank sanction
In March 2021, GMV subsidiary Grupo Mecánica del Vuelo Sistemas S.A.U. was barred by the World Bank for three and a half years in connection with collusive, corrupt and fraudulent practices, as defined by the World Bank’s Sanctions Procedures, relating to a sustainable city development project (in Danang, Vietnam) and the Hanoi Urban Transport Development Project, also in Vietnam. This decision makes Grupo Mecánica del Vuelo Sistemas S.A.U. ineligible to participate in projects financed by institutions of the World Bank Group for the period mentioned; Grupo Mecánica del Vuelo Sistemas S.A.U. has agreed to meet specific compliance requirements as a condition for release from debarment.

References

External links
 Official GMV website

Technology companies of Spain
Technology companies established in 1984
1984 establishments in Spain